Brass is a metal alloy of copper and zinc.

"Brass" is also military slang for officers, especially high-ranking ones with broad decision-making powers; it is also used to refer to senior management in companies and other organizations.

Brass may also refer to:

Arts and culture
 Brass, brass instruments, musical instruments usually made of brass; or the part of an orchestra composed of players of those instruments 
 Brass, a novel by  Helen Walsh
 Brass (album), an album by Minibosses
 Brass (board game), a board game set in England during the industrial revolution
 Brass (film), a 1923 silent film romance
 Brass (TV series), a 1980s British television series starring Timothy West

Geography
 Brass, Nigeria, a local government area in Bayelsa State, Nigeria
 Twon-Brass, a town in Nigeria, head of the Brass local government area
 Brass Island, island in Nigeria, site of Twon-Brass

People with the surname
 Chris Brass (born 1975), English footballer
 Daniel J. Brass (born ca 1948), American organizational theorist
 Eleanor Brass (1905–1992), Canadian write
 John Brass, rugby player
 John Brass (colliery manager)
 John Brass (writer)
 Jim Brass, a character on the television series CSI: Crime Scene Investigation
 Leonard John Brass (1900–1971), Australian botanist
 Steffani Brass (born 1992), American actress
 Tinto Brass (born 1933), Italian filmmaker

Other
 "Brass", English slang term for money, i.e. "brass in pocket"; as well as effrontery and in an alternative context, also slang for a prostitute
 "Brass", the metallic body of a cartridge case, usually made of brass
 Horse brass, a plaque used to decorate shire horses
 Monumental brass, commemorative plates laid down in British and European churches